The Muslim Judicial Council SA (MJC), a non-profit umbrella body of Sunni Islamic clerics in South Africa, is headquartered in Cape Town, South Africa. It was established in 1945 by the Muslim Progressive Society. As of 2009, approximately 150 mosques were affiliated with it.

Yusuf Karaan was head mufti of the council and his son Taha Karaan served the post until his death on 11 June 2021.
The current President of the MJC is Shaykh Irfaan Abrahams. The 1st Deputy President is Moulana Abdul Khaliq Allie and the 2nd Deputy President is Shaykh Riad Fataar.

References

External links
Muslim Judicial Council website

Islamic organisations based in South Africa
Islamic organizations established in 1945
Religion in Cape Town